"Regn hos mej" is a song written Orup, and recorded by him on the album Orup 2. The song peaked at eight position at Swedish singles chart, and also topped Sommartoppen between 1–8 July 1989.

In 2003 the song was recorded by Miio on the album "På vårt sätt". In 2006, Shirley Clamp recorded the song on her album "Favoriter på svenska". Erik Linder recorded the song in 2009 on the album Inifrån.

Charts

References

External links 

 

1987 songs
1987 singles
Orup songs
Shirley Clamp songs
Warner Music Group singles
Songs written by Orup
Swedish-language songs